Jeff Gianola (born October 2, 1955) is the head news anchor for KOIN 6, the CBS affiliate station in Portland, Oregon.

Career
Gianola grew up in San Diego, California, and came to Portland's KATU, the city's ABC affiliate, in 1983 from a stint at a Santa Barbara, California, station where he was the general-assignment reporter. After doing the weather and morning anchoring at KATU for a few years, he was moved to evening anchor in 1985. He was teamed with Julie Emry, and the pair co-anchored KATU's evening newscasts for several years in the late 1980s and 1990s.  Gianola left KATU for CBS affiliate KOIN, in August 1998. In September 1999, Gianola wrote, produced and starred in "Quick Tips for Easy Living", a lifestyle program that aired Saturday afternoons on KOIN. The program was cancelled in October 1999. Gianola's news partner was Anne State until she left broadcast news to care for her parents in April 2015. Gianola produced the documentary "No Perfect Answers: The Life and Architecture of Pietro Belluschi".

Gianola is the father of five children; two girls from a previous marriage and three children with his current wife, Shannon. The family lives in Tigard. Gianola is the president and founder of the Wednesday's Child Foundation. This foundation helps to raise funds for children in foster care to participate in activities such as camps, lessons, and sports teams.

Gianola played a television news reporter in the 2003 William Friedkin film The Hunted. His name appears on the train in several scenes. He also had a cameo in the 1999 Kelley Baker film Birddog.

References

External links 

No Perfect Answers website

1955 births
Living people
Television anchors from Portland, Oregon
Male actors from San Diego
People from Tigard, Oregon
Male actors from Oregon